The Leakey family is a British and Kenyan family consisting of a number of notable military figures, agricultural scientists and archaeologists of the 20th and 21st centuries. Originally a family from Somerset and Devon in south-west England in the 1500-1600s, it has spread worldwide. The Kenyan branch can be traced back to the Bazett sisters who were early missionaries at the turn of 19th Century; with Mary Bazett marrying Harry Leakey before setting up a Mission School at Kabete.

Notable members

Archaeology and science
Colin Leakey (1933-2018), plant scientist; son of Louis Leakey
Louis Leakey (1903–1972), archaeologist; son of Harry Leakey and cousin of Nigel and Rea Leakey
Louise Leakey (born 1972), paleontologist; daughter of Meave and Richard Leakey, married to Prince Emmanuel de Merode
Mary Leakey (1913–1996), archaeologist; wife of Louis Leakey
Meave Leakey (born 1942), palaeoanthropologist; wife of Richard Leakey
Richard Leakey (1944-2022), politician and palaeoanthropologist; son of Louis and Mary Leakey
Roger Leakey (born 1946), plant scientist and tropical agriculturalist; son of Douglas and Beryl and nephew of Louis Leakey
Andrew Leakey (born 1977), plant scientist; son of Roger and Alison Leakey
Chris Leakey (born 1981), marine ecologist and behavioural scientist; son of Roger and Alison Leakey

Military
Lieutenant General David Leakey (born 1952), senior British Army officer and former Black Rod
Joshua Leakey (born  1988), Victoria Cross recipient; son of Mark Leakey
Air Commodore Mark Leakey, senior Royal Air Force officer and Director of the Armed Forces Christian Union; father of Joshua Leakey
Nigel Leakey (1913–1941), Victoria Cross recipient; brother of Rea Leakey
Major General Rea Leakey (1915–1999), decorated senior British Army officer; brother of Nigel Leakey

Other
Arundell Gray Leakey, farmer killed in the Mau Mau Uprising; father of Nigel and Rea Leakey
Robert ("Bob") Leakey (1914–2013), engineer and cave diver; brother of Nigel and Rea Leakey
Caroline Leakey (1827–1881), writer; daughter of James Leakey
The Reverend Harry Leakey, 20th century missionary; father of Louis Leakey
James Leakey (1775–1866), artist; grandfather of Harry Leakey and great-great-uncle of Nigel and Rea Leakey
Philip Leakey (born 1949), politician; son of Louis and Mary Leakey

Leakey family tree

References

Leakey family
Noble families of the United Kingdom
Kenyan people of British descent